Littauer and Litauer are German language surnames. The word  means "a Lithuanian". The surnames may refer to:

 Florence Littauer (1928–2020), Christian writer and motivational speaker
 Lucius Littauer (1859–1944), politician, businessman, and college football coach
 Mary Aiken Littauer (1912–2005), equestrian
 Vladimir Littauer (1892–1989), horseback riding master

German-language surnames
Jewish surnames